Food and Shelter is a 2015 Spanish drama directed by  in his directorial feature debut. It stars Natalia de Molina, who won a Goya Award for her Leading Performance as an unemployed single mother.

The film reflects the stresses faced by individuals as the impact of the 2007–2008 global economic crisis continues to be felt in the Spanish economy.

Plot 
Rocío, an unemployed single mother, has barely enough to eat as she does not receive unemployment benefits. Between feelings of shame, failure and the fear of losing custody of her 8-year-old son Adrián, she tries to maintain the appearance of living a normal life with some help from a neighbour. The situation becomes worse when the landlord, himself overwhelmed by debts, sues her for the rent she owes.

Cast

Production 
Food and Shelter is the first feature film from Juan Miguel del Castillo, an experienced editor and director of shorts. A Diversa Audiovisual production, the film was largely financed by crowdfunding. It was primarily shot in Jerez, in the province of Cádiz.

Release 
The film premiered at the 18th Málaga Film Festival on 23 April 2015. Its festival run also included the Film and Human Rights Festival of Pamplona, the Ourense International Film Festival, and the Tallinn Black Nights Film Festival. Distributed by A Contracorriente Films, it was theatrically released in Spain on 4 December 2015.

Accolades 

|-
| rowspan = "2" align = "center" | 2015 || rowspan = "2" | 18th Málaga Film Festival || Silver Biznaga for Best Actress || Natalia de Molina ||  || rowspan = "2" | 
|-
| colspan = "2" | Audience Award || 
|-
| rowspan = "4" align = "center" | 2016 || rowspan = "3" | 30th Goya Awards || Best Actress || Natalia de Molina ||  || rowspan = "3" |  
|-
| Best New Director || Juan Miguel del Castillo ||  
|-
| Best Original Song || "Techo y comida" by Daniel Quiñones Perulero and Miguel Carabante Manzano || 
|-
| 60th Sant Jordi Awards || Best Spanish Actress || Natalia de Molina ||  || 
|}

See also 
 List of Spanish films of 2015

References

External links
 
 This article is derived from Techo y comida by journalists from 20minutos.es which is available under the Creative Commons Attribution-ShareAlike License. Retrieved 29 January 2018.

2015 films
2015 drama films
Spanish drama films
Crowdfunded films
Social realism in film
2010s Spanish films
2015 directorial debut films
Films shot in the province of Cádiz